The Villa of Doctor B, popularly known as  or  is a private villa in the Anfa Supérieur neighborhood of Casablanca, Morocco. It was designed by the German architect Wolfgang Ewerth and in 1962.

Architecture 
It contains a traditional Moroccan salon, though it is round.

Gallery

References 

Buildings and structures in Casablanca
Architecture in Morocco